Ritu Sarin is an Indian film director, producer and artist based in Dharamshala, India. She was born in New Delhi. She did her undergraduate studies at Miranda House in Delhi University and went on to do her MFA in Film and Video from California College of the Arts (formerly California College of Arts and Crafts) in Oakland. She is the recipient of Miranda House’s 2010 Distinguished Alumna Award. She is married to Tibetan filmmaker Tenzing Sonam with whom she has two children.

Films

While at CCA, Sarin made a number of experimental films, including Hercules and The Mind Gap.

In 1985, Sarin and Tenzing Sonam worked on their first film together, The New Puritans: The Sikhs of Yuba City, as a joint thesis project. The film was subsequently broadcast on national PBS.

In 1987, Sarin and Sonam moved to London were they worked as programme directors at the Meridian Trust, a Buddhist and Tibet-related film archive and production company. While at the Meridian Trust, they documented a number of historic trips made by the Dalai Lama, including his Nobel Peace Prize visit to Norway and his first trip to the Russian Buddhist republics of Kalmykia and Buryatia. They left the Meridian Trust in 1991 and founded their own company, White Crane Films. All their films since then have been made under its banner and includes several documentaries, video installations and two dramatic feature films.

A recurring subject in their work is Tibet, with which they have been intimately involved in a number of different ways: personally, politically and artistically. Through their films and artwork, they have attempted to document, question and reflect on the questions of exile, identity, culture and nationalism that confront the Tibetan people.

Their latest film, The Sweet Requiem, had its world premiere at the 2018 Toronto International Film Festival.

Filmography

Art projects

Other activities

Ritu was a founding member of the Bay Area Friends of Tibet in the San Francisco Bay Area, one of the earliest Tibet support groups in the US.

She and Tenzing organised the first-ever Tibet Film Festival in London in March 1992 in collaboration with the Institute for Contemporary Art (ICA). And in March 2000, they organised Tibet 2000: Survival of the Spirit, a ten-day festival of Tibet at the India International Centre in New Delhi, which included film screenings, photographic exhibitions, the creation of a sand mandala, performances by the Tibetan Institute of Performing Arts, seminars and panel discussions by well-known writers and scholars, and a public talk by the Dalai Lama.

Ritu participated in the KHOJ Marathon with Hans Ulrich Obrist in New Delhi on 22 January 2011. She was also a part of the Engadin Art Talks in Zuoz, Switzerland, in August 2012, a symposium on art and architecture directed by Beatrix Ruf, director and curator of the Kunsthalle Zurich, and Hans Ulrich Obrist, Co-Director of Exhibitions and Programme at the Serpentine Gallery in London.

In 2012, Ritu and Tenzing founded the non-profit organisation, White Crane Arts & Media, to fulfil their long-held desire to promote contemporary art, cinema and independent media practices in the Himalayan regions. Its first project, in collaboration with Khoj International Artists’ Association, was an artists’ residency which was held in Dharamshala in October 2012. Its main project – the Dharamshala International Film Festival – had its first edition in November 2012 and is now considered to be one of India's top independent film festivals.

Ritu was awarded a residency at the Rockefeller Institute Bellagio Center in 2017.

She served on the jury for the International Competition section of the 2019 Sydney Film Festival.

See also
Dreaming Lhasa
White Crane Films

References

External links

Living people
Indian documentary filmmakers
People from Dharamshala
People from New Delhi
Film producers from Delhi
Film directors from Delhi
20th-century Indian film directors
21st-century Indian film directors
Indian women documentary filmmakers
Year of birth missing (living people)
20th-century Indian women